is a passenger railway station in the city of Midori, Gunma, Japan, operated by the third sector railway company Watarase Keikoku Railway.

Lines

Station layout
The station consists of a single side platform. There is no station building, but only an open-sided shelter on the platform. The station is unattended.

Adjacent stations

History
Nakano Station opened on 29 March 1989.

Surrounding area

See also
 List of railway stations in Japan

External links

   Station information (Watarase Keikoku) 

Railway stations in Gunma Prefecture
Railway stations in Japan opened in 1989
Midori, Gunma